University College South Denmark is a university college in the southern part of Denmark. It offers bachelor courses in various disciplines and has approximately 5,900 students and 700 employees.

History
University College South Denmark was founded in 2011, when University College South and West Jutland University College were merged. University College South was formed on 1 January 2008, replacing the former CDE Sønderjylland and had offices in Esbjerg, Kolding, Haderslev, Aabenraa, and Sønderborg.

Courses 
The following courses can be taken at University College South Denmark:

 Public administration (Esbjerg);
 Biomedical science (Esbjerg);
 Ergotherapy (Esbjerg);
 Business language and IT-based marketing communication (Haderslev);
 Nutrition and Health (Haderslev);
 Physiotherapy (Esbjerg and Haderslev);
 Graphic communication (Haderslev);
 Midwifery (Esbjerg);
 Teaching (Esbjerg and Haderslev);
 Media and sonic communication - Sound design (Haderslev);
 Pedagogue (Esbjerg, Kolding and Aabenraa);
 Social worker (Esbjerg and Aabenraa);
 Nursing (Esbjerg and Sønderborg).

Knowledge Center 
 Knowledge of teaching profession;
 Knowledge of learning resources and evaluation;
 Knowledge management, organization and competence;
 Knowledge Center for Health Promotion;
 Knowledge of pedagogy and welfare innovation;
 Knowledge of special social pedagogy and social work;
 Knowledge of sound design and sound marketing.

References

External links 
 

Colleges in Denmark
Universities in Denmark